Vladimír Guma Kulhánek (born 4 September 1944) is a Czech rock bass guitarist. 

Kulhánek was born in Prague, then part of the Protectorate of Bohemia and Moravia, and studied at Institute of Chemical Technology in Prague. He was a member of Flamengo, Etc..., Stromboli, Bohemia and several other bands. He was also a sought-after session musician, playing with Dežo Ursiny, Eva Pilarová, Jana Kratochvílová, Anna K and others. He is currently a member of T4, November 2nd, Energit and a supergroup called Kulhánek/Holeček/Razím/Kowacz.

Selected discography
Flamengo: Kuře v hodinkách (1971)
Dežo Ursiny: Dežo Ursiny & Provisorium (1973)
Bohemia: Zrnko písku (1978)
Stromboli: Stromboli (1987)
Vladimír Mišík & Etc...: Etc...4 (1987)
Vladimír Mišík & Etc...: 20 deka duše (1990)
Vladimír Mišík & Etc...: Jen se směj (1993)
Vladimír Mišík & Etc...: Live - unplugged (1994)
Bratři Ebenové: Tichá domácnost (1995)
Vladimír Mišík & Etc...: Město z peřin (1996)
Krausberry: Šiksa a gádžo (1998)
Bratři Karamazovi: Apokalypsa - obrazy Janova zjevení (2001)
November : Midnight Desert (2002)
November : Little Miss Behavin' & the Troublemakers (2005)
T4: Pár tónů a slov (2005)
November 2nd: Night Walk with Me (2011)

References

External links
 T4 Official website
 November 2nd Official website
 Vladimír Guma Kulhánek na Discogs

1944 births
Living people
Czech bass guitarists
Energit (band) members
Etc (band) members